Joonas Angeria (born Joonas Mikael Angeria 23 March 1989), is a Finnish music producer, songwriter and musician. He is known for writing and producing hit songs for artists such as Isac Elliot, Pentatonix, Julie Bergan, Mads Langer, Paula Vesala, Robin, and Sjur.

Songwriting

Productions

Notes

References

Living people
Finnish male musicians
1989 births